The House Arrest of Us is a 2020 Philippine romantic comedy streaming television series starring Kathryn Bernardo and Daniel Padilla, directed by Richard Arellano and written by Carmi Raymundo. It is about an engaged couple who get locked in one house with both their families. The series was produced under Star Cinema and was first made available online on October 24, 2020, on KTX, iWantTFC and TFC IPTV PPV.

Plot
Korics and Q at long last choose to get ready for marriage. However, as Korics' enormous freed family goes to Q's critical and nouveau riche family for the pamamanhikan (courtship), the government abruptly declares a total hard lockdown. The couple should live with one another and their fighting families during the COVID-19 pandemic.

Cast

Main
 Kathryn Bernardo as Queencess "Q" Capili
 Daniel Padilla as Enrico "Korics" de Guzman

Supporting
 Herbert Bautista as Sylverter "Sylver" Capili
 Ruffa Gutierrez as Zenaida "Zena" Capili
 Gardo Versoza as Rudy "Papawan" de Guzman
 Arlene Muhlach as Bernadette "Berna" de Guzman
 Dennis Padilla as Papatu
 Anthony Jennings as Rufus de Guzman
 Riva Quenery as Abigail "Abi" de Guzman
 Alora Sasam as Yaya Marie
 Hyubs Azarcon as Mang Roger
Marc Logan as the Interviewer
Ria Atayde as Q's best friend
Juan Miguel Severo as Q's best friend
Summer Ford as herself

Guest
Kakai Bautista as Estella

Production
The digital series was shot during the enhanced community quarantine in Luzon imposed in early 2020 as a response to the COVID-19 pandemic. Bernardo and Padilla said that it is hard for them to shoot the series project because they need to follow various pandemic-related safety protocols with the cast not allowed to go out of the village were the series was filmed. Bernardo also clarified that digital series was not connected to their 2018 film The Hows of Us, other than the similarity of the name of the series with the film.

Release
The House Arrest of Us was first made available on October 24, 2020, through KTX.ph. It was also released through iWantTFC. Episodes were released weekly, with the last episode made available on January 16, 2021.

The series was also made available for streaming on Netflix in the Philippines starting February 1, 2021. Netflix reached out to the producers of the series for rights to stream the series even before its original run ended.

References

External links
 

2020 Philippine television series debuts
2021 Philippine television series endings
Television shows about the COVID-19 pandemic